The 1978 Stockholm Open was a men's tennis tournament played on hard courts and part of the 1978 Colgate-Palmolive Grand Prix and took place at the Kungliga tennishallen in Stockholm, Sweden. The tournament was held from 6 November through 12 November 1978. Third-seeded John McEnroe won the singles title.

Finals

Singles

 John McEnroe defeated  Tim Gullikson, 6–2, 6–2 
 It was McEnroe's 3rd singles title of the year and of his career.

Doubles

 Wojciech Fibak /  Tom Okker defeated  Bob Lutz /  Stan Smith, 6–3, 6–2

References

External links
  
 Association of Tennis Professionals (ATP) tournament profile

Stockholm Open
Stockholm Open
Stockholm Open
Stockholm Open
1970s in Stockholm